Yanuya is an island within the Mamanuca Islands of Fiji in the South Pacific. The island is close to the Tokoriki island.

History
The majority of the Mamanuca islands were never inhabited because of the intense sun and lack of fresh water. Just three of the large volcanic islands—Malolo, Yanuya, and Tavua—were able to provide enough support for fishing villages. The village in Yanuya is known for pottery making.

Cruising
Yachts that wish to visit the Monoriki Island, where the Tom Hanks movie Castaway was filmed, must first make a visit to the chief at Yanuya for sevu sevu. There are moorings at Yanuya and in addition to the traditional kava root offering, cruisers must also pay $20FJD for landing at Monoriki. This must be done before going to the other island.

References

External links
 Yanuya Island, near Tokoriki Island Resort, Mamunucas, Fiji Islands

Islands of Fiji
Mamanuca Islands